The 1993–94 UEFA Champions League first round was the first stage of the competition proper of the 1993–94 UEFA Champions League, and featured 32 teams. It began on 15 September with the first legs and ended on 29 September 1993 with the second legs. The 16 winners advanced to the second round.

Times are CET/CEST, as listed by UEFA.

Teams
In total, 32 teams participated in the first round: 22 teams which entered in this round, and 10 winners of the preliminary round.

Format
Each tie was played over two legs, with each team playing one leg at home. The team that scored more goals on aggregate over the two legs advanced to the next round. If the aggregate score was level, the away goals rule was applied, i.e. the team that scored more goals away from home over the two legs advanced. If away goals were also equal, then extra time was played. The away goals rule would be again applied after extra time, i.e. if there were goals scored during extra time and the aggregate score was still level, the visiting team advanced by virtue of more away goals scored. If no goals were scored during extra time, the tie was decided by penalty shoot-out.

Draw
The draw for the first round was held on 14 July 1993 in Geneva, Switzerland.

Summary

The first legs were played on 15 and 16 September, and the second legs on 28 and 29 September 1993.

|}

Matches

Porto won 2–0 on aggregate.

Feyenoord won 3–1 on aggregate.

Monaco won 2–1 on aggregate.

4–4 on aggregate. Steaua București won on away goals.

4–4 on aggregate. Levski Sofia won on away goals.

Werder Bremen won 6–3 on aggregate.

Copenhagen won 4–3 on aggregate.

Milan won 1–0 on aggregate.

Sparta Prague won 2–1 on aggregate.

Anderlecht won 6–0 on aggregate.

Manchester United won 5–3 on aggregate.

Galatasaray won 3–1 on aggregate.

Lech Poznań won 7–2 on aggregate.

Spartak Moscow won 9–0 on aggregate.

Barcelona won 5–4 on aggregate.

Austria Wien won 5–4 on aggregate.

Notes

References

External links

First round
September 1993 sports events in Europe